Macdonald, MacDonald, or McDonald ministry may refer to:

 1st Canadian Ministry, the Canadian government led by Sir John A. Macdonald from 1867 to 1873
 3rd Canadian Ministry, the Canadian government led by Sir John A. Macdonald from 1878 to 1891

 First MacDonald ministry, the British minority government led by Ramsay MacDonald from January to November 1924
 Second MacDonald ministry, the British minority government led by Ramsay MacDonald from 1929 to 1931
 Third MacDonald ministry, the British coalition government led by Ramsay MacDonald from August to October 1931
 Fourth MacDonald ministry, the British coalition government led by Ramsay MacDonald from 1931 to 1935

 First McDonald ministry, the Victoria government led by John McDonald from 1950 to 1952
 Second McDonald ministry, the Victoria government led by John McDonald from October to December 1952

See also
 National Government (United Kingdom)